Twu Shiing-jer (born 17 June 1951) is a Taiwanese politician. He was the Minister of the Department of Health from 2002 to 2003 and later served in the Legislative Yuan from 2008 to 2012. He was the Mayor of Chiayi City from 25 December 2014 to 25 December 2018.

Education 
Twu obtained his bachelor's degree in medicine and master's degree in public health from National Taiwan University. He then obtained his doctoral degree from the University of California, Los Angeles in the United States.

Health minister
Twu succeeded Lee Ming-liang as minister of the Department of Health on 1 September 2002 and resigned on 16 May 2003.

Mayor of Chiayi City

2009 Chiayi City mayor election
Twu joined the 2009 Republic of China local elections for the position of Chiayi City mayor. The elections were held on 5 December 2009. He eventually lost to Kuomintang candidate Huang Min-hui.

2014 Chiayi City mayor election
Twu won a party primary held in March 2014, and was named the Democratic Progressive Party candidate for the Chiayi City mayoralty. In September, Twu asked the voters to choose the best person, not the wealthiest, referring to politicians from Kuomintang who were mostly backed by their huge assets and government resources to work with business conglomerates run by wealthy families to control local political factions and influence election outcomes. He ran his campaign under the slogan Bold leadership, Chuluo, heading up for Taiwan. Chiayi was a part of Chuluo County until 1787 when it was renamed.

Twu was elected as the Mayor of Chiayi City after winning the 2014 Chiayi City mayoralty election held on 29 November 2014.

2018 Chiayi City mayor election

References

External links

 

1951 births
Living people
Members of the 7th Legislative Yuan
Democratic Progressive Party Members of the Legislative Yuan
Party List Members of the Legislative Yuan
Mayors of Chiayi
Taiwanese Ministers of Health and Welfare
Taiwanese expatriates in the United States
University of California, Los Angeles alumni
National Taiwan University alumni